The Cathedral of the Visitation also called Vilkaviškis Cathedral is a religious building of the Catholic Church that serves as the cathedral of Vilkaviškis, Lithuania, and is the seat of the Diocese of Vilkaviškis.

The church was built in Romanesque style, between 1870 and 1881 and was consecrated in 1884. With the erection of the Diocese of Vilkaviškis in 1926, the church was elevated to the rank of cathedral. The building suffered no major damage during World War II, however, the Russian authorities authorized their gradual dismantling to use their materials for civil construction. After the fall of communism in the country the cathedral was rebuilt from 1991 and the works were completed in 1998.

See also
Roman Catholicism in Lithuania
Cathedral of the Blessed Virgin Mary

References

Roman Catholic cathedrals in Lithuania
Buildings and structures in Vilkaviškis
Roman Catholic churches completed in 1881
1881 establishments in the Russian Empire
19th-century Roman Catholic church buildings in Lithuania